Piz Segnas is a mountain in the Glarus Alps, located on the border between the cantons of Glarus and Graubünden. Piz Sardona is on the same ridge to the north, from where the Trinserhorn or Piz Dolf lies to the southeast. The Tschingelhoerner with the famous Martinsloch (hole of St.Martin) lies to the west, with the Pass dil Segnas between the two mountains.

The mountain lies in the municipalities of Flims, in the canton of Graubünden, and Glarus Süd, in the canton of Glarus. The nearest settlements are the villages of Flims, to the south, and Elm, to the west. A path crosses the Pass dil Segnas between the two villages. The easiest access to the area is an aerial cableway to Fil de Cassons (not active since 2015)from Flims or the hike to this ridge lying southeast of Piz Segnas.

On 4 August 2018, a Junkers Ju 52 aircraft, operating a sightseeing flight, crashed into the western flank of the mountain, killing all 20 persons aboard.

References

External links

Piz Segnas on Summitpost

Mountains of the Alps
Alpine three-thousanders
Mountains of Switzerland
Glarus thrust
Mountains of the canton of Glarus
Mountains of Graubünden
Glarus–Graubünden border
Flims